My Journey (stylized as "MY JOURNEY") is the sixth studio album and debut Chinese-language studio album by Malaysian singer-songwriter, Shila Amzah. It was released physically on April 30, 2016, through Shilala (HK) Limited. Shila began preparing for the album during the same year after she participated I Am a Singer (season 2), and during a significant amount of media scrutiny. Shila was 26 years old at the time of the album's release and she is the first Malay artist to release a full Chinese studio album at Beijing, China.

Musically, the album is mandopop music styled, and lyrically it speaks of romantic relationships and breakups, a couple of Shila wrote from experiencing a relationship before. Lyrics also touch on Shila's personal struggles in life. In contrast to Shila's previous work, the production of My Journey consists of drum programming, synthesizers, pulsating bass, processed backing vocals, and guitars.

Background 

Shila released her fifth album, Shila Amzah, on December 10, 2013. This album, My Journey marked a change in Shila's musical style with the experimentation of mandopop. Before Shila finally release a Chinese studio album, Shila suffered struggles with recording contracts with Shanghai Media Group before establishing her own major recording label, Shilala (HK) Limited. The album was delayed almost 2 years. Before this, Shila stated the album will be released by March 2016, but it was delayed to April 2016 because some of her songs were mastered and mixed in the United States of America late.

Album packaging and release

My Journey was released on April 30, 2016, with seven tracks alongside three bonus tracks. Shila began teasing an announcement in March 2016. On April 22, 2016, Shila unveiled the album cover on Instagram featuring the date of her press conference. On April 30, 2016, Shila held a press conference launched her debut Chinese-language album.

Singles 
On May 28, 2015, Shila released her debut Chinese single in Hong Kong, "再见不再见" through her very own major recording label, Shilala (HK) Limited. The song was written by Liao Yu and composed by Shila herself. This single had been performed live during her Shila Amzah: The Symbol of Love, International Press Conference. The song became an instant hit on Weibo Music when the single reached 1 million downloads in just two days.

On October 1, 2015, Shila performed her second Chinese single in Hong Kong, "再见" during her Shila Amzah Meet & Greet Hong Kong. On October 6, 2015, Shila released the single through Shilala (HK) Limited on Weibo Music and iTunes.

On July 11, 2016, Shila announced that "Selamanya Cinta" feat. Alif Satar will be released as the official fifth single from the album on July 14, 2016. On July 14, 2016, Shila released "Selamanya Cinta" feat. Alif Satar through Sony Music Malaysia (streaming) and on July 15, 2016 through Shila Amzah Entertainment Berhad (digital and streaming).

Track listing

Release history

Singles

References 

2016 debut albums
Chinese-language albums
Mandarin-language albums
Malay-language albums
Shila Amzah albums
Mandopop albums
Albums produced by Shila Amzah